is a Japanese manufacturing company headquartered in Morinomiya-chūō, Chūō-ku, Osaka, which produces a variety of stationery products as well a wide range of art materials. Nevertheless, Sakura is mostly known by its marker pens, such as the Pigma line.

History 
The company started as a crayons manufacturer in 1921. By 1924, Sakura invented the first-ever oil pastel that combined oil and pigment, which was patented globally as the "" trademark.

In 1982, the firm launched its famous Pigma marker pen lines. In 1984, Sakura invented the first gel-based ink, featured in its new ballpoint pens lines. Gel ink pens are currently produced by many stationery companies.

In 1991 Sakura acquired the Dutch company Royal Talens, and in 1997 the dutch pencil maker Bruynzeel.

The North-American division of the company, "Sakura Color Products of America, Inc." was established in Hayward, California in 1986. Other division of Sakura in Asia, "Shanghai Sakura International Trading Co., Ltd." was established in Shanghai, China in 2002.

Products 

The following is a list with the large range of products commercialized by Sakura:

Cray-Pas Wonderful, Colorful World Contest
Sakura of America started the annual national art contest in the United States in 1996. The contest is open to all U.S. students grades K through 8 to create a picture that is drawn mostly with oil pastels, preferably Cray-Pas. The judging is done by separate grade categories: K-2, 3-5 and 6-8. Three winners in each category are medalists and 25 more students are awarded honorable mention.  There have been 17,000 submissions each year with winning entries displayed online and some have been published in printed material.

References

External links

 
 Sakura of America

Manufacturing companies established in 1921
Manufacturing companies based in Osaka
Art materials brands
Artists' acrylic paint brands
Gouache brands
Oil paint brands
Watercolor brands
Pen manufacturers
Japanese brands
Japanese stationery
Japanese companies established in 1921